Lozen was a 19th-century female warrior and prophet of the Apache Native Americans.

Lozen may also refer to the following places:

Antarctica 
 Mount Lozen, a mountain in Antarctica
 Lozen Nunatak, a hill on Livingston Island in Antarctica

Bulgaria 
 Lozen, Haskovo Province, a village in Lyubimets Municipality
 Lozen, Pazardzhik Province, a village in Septemvri Municipality
 Lozen, Sofia City Province, a village in Sofia Capital Municipality
 Lozen Monastery, a monastery near Sofia, Bulgaria
 Lozen Mountain
 , a village in Stara Zagora Municipality
 , a village in Strazhitsa Municipality

Other 
 Lozen, Belgium, a hamlet near Bocholt, Belgium

See also 
 Losen (disambiguation)